Aye Gill Pike is a Marilyn in the Yorkshire Dales, the highest point of the ridge of Rise Hill between Dentdale and Garsdale in Cumbria, England.

Marilyns of England
Peaks of the Yorkshire Dales
Mountains and hills of Cumbria
Dent, Cumbria